The 2002 Cincinnati Bearcats football team represented the University of Cincinnati in the 2002 NCAA Division I-A football season. The team, coached by Rick Minter, played its home games in Nippert Stadium, as it has since 1924. The Bearcats finished the season 7–7 (6–2 in the C-USA) and were invited to the New Orleans bowl, where they lost 24–19 to North Texas.

Schedule

Roster

Awards and milestones

Conference USA honors

Offensive player of the week
Week 1: Gino Guidugli

Defensive player of the week
Week 4: Blue Adams
Week 5: Antwan Peek
Week 10: Andre Frazier
Week 13: Antwan Peek

All-Conference USA First Team

Kirt Doolin, OL
LaDaris Vann, WR

Antwan Peek, DL

All-Conference USA Second Team

Gino Guidugli, QB
DeMarco McCleskey, RB
Jonathan Ruffin, K

Blue Adams, DB

All-Conference USA Rookie Team
Chet Ervin, P
Joel Yakovac, OL

Players in the 2003 NFL Draft

References

Cincinnati
Cincinnati Bearcats football seasons
Conference USA football champion seasons
Cincinnati Bearcats football